The enzyme β-Alanyl-CoA ammonia-lyase (EC 4.3.1.6) catalyzes the chemical reaction

β-alanyl-CoA  acryloyl-CoA + NH3

This enzyme belongs to the family of lyases, specifically ammonia lyases, which cleave carbon-nitrogen bonds.  The systematic name of this enzyme class is β-alanyl-CoA ammonia-lyase (acryloyl-CoA-forming). This enzyme is also called β-alanyl coenzyme A ammonia-lyase.  This enzyme participates in β-alanine metabolism and propanoate metabolism.

References

 

EC 4.3.1
Enzymes of unknown structure